En el séptimo día (English: On the Seventh Day) is a 2017 American Spanish-language independent drama film directed by Jim McKay. Set over the course of seven days, the film depicts a group of undocumented Mexican immigrants living in Sunset Park, Brooklyn, who form a soccer team.

The film premiered at BAMcinemaFest in Brooklyn in June 2017, and screened in the International Competition section at the Locarno Festival in August 2017. In February 2019, it won the John Cassavetes Award at the 34th Independent Spirit Awards.

Plot
José, a bicycle delivery worker, leads a soccer team of undocumented immigrants from Puebla, Mexico. As the championship game approaches the coming Sunday, José's boss demands that he work that day for a private party.

Cast
 Fernando Cardona as José
 Gilberto Jimenez as Elmer
 Abel Perez as Jesús
 Genoel Ramírez as Artemio
 Alfonso Velasquez as Felix
 Alejandro Huitzil as Nacho
 Gilberto Arenas as Alfonso
 Ricardo Gonzalez as Ricardo
 Eduardo Espinosa as Juan
 Ernesto Lucero as Baltasar
 Mathia Vargas as Lisa

Production
McKay first conceived of the story in October 2001. The project was shelved for over a decade as McKay went on to direct Everyday People (2004), Angel Rodriguez (2005), and several television series until he resumed working on the film in 2015. The script was inspired in part by the book Mexican New York by Robert Smith, which studies a community of migrants from the state of Puebla, Mexico, to Sunset Park, Brooklyn. McKay said, "[I]nspired by this book, the idea that though we might live in the melting pot of New York City, we are often territorial, rarely venturing into or getting to know surrounding neighborhoods a stone's throw away, came into focus once again."

The main cast consisted entirely of non-professional actors who were Mexican immigrants, most of whom had come from Sunset Park. The casting process began in the summer of 2015 and lasted for seven months. Each actor was cast without determining which character in the script he would play, and the roles were finally assigned after a period of script reading and soccer practices. Filming took place over the course of 19 days in June and July 2016, in the neighborhoods of Sunset Park, Park Slope, and Gowanus.

Reception
On review aggregator website Rotten Tomatoes, the film holds an approval rating of 100% based on 31 reviews, with an average rating of 8.2/10. On Metacritic, the film has a score 87 out of 100, based on 14 critics, indicating "universal acclaim".

References

External links
 
 

2017 films
2010s Spanish-language films
American independent films
2017 independent films
2010s sports drama films
American association football films
Films set in Brooklyn
Films shot in New York City
American sports drama films
2017 drama films
Spanish-language American films
2010s American films
John Cassavetes Award winners